Emma-Louise Corrin (born 13 December 1995) is an English actor. They portrayed Diana, Princess of Wales in the fourth season of the Netflix historical drama The Crown (2020), for which they won a Golden Globe and were nominated for a Primetime Emmy Award. They have since starred in the 2022 romantic drama films My Policeman and Lady Chatterley's Lover.

Early life and education
Emma-Louise Corrin was born on 13 December 1995 in Royal Tunbridge Wells, Kent. Their father, Chris Corrin, is a businessman and their mother, Juliette Corrin, is a speech therapist from South Africa. They have two younger brothers, Richard and Jonty. Their family is based in Seal, Kent, near Sevenoaks.

Corrin attended the Roman Catholic Woldingham School in Surrey, an all-girl boarding school where they developed their interest in acting and dance. They took a gap year, during which they took a Shakespeare course at the London Academy of Music and Dramatic Art and volunteered as a teacher at a school in Knysna, South Africa. They studied drama at the University of Bristol, but left to study Education, English, Drama and the Arts at St John's College, Cambridge from 2015 to 2018.

Career

Corrin made their television debut in 2019 with a guest appearance in an episode of the ITV detective drama Grantchester and a recurring role as Esme Winikus in the first season of the Epix DC series Pennyworth. This was followed by their feature film debut as Jillian Jessup in Misbehaviour.

Corrin was cast as Princess Diana in the fourth season of the Netflix historical drama The Crown, which was released in November 2020. For their performance, Corrin received a number of accolades, including the Golden Globe Award for Best Actress – Television Series Drama, the Critics' Choice Television Award for Best Actress in a Drama Series, as well as a nomination for the Primetime Emmy Award for Outstanding Lead Actress in a Drama Series.

Corrin was nominated for a Laurence Olivier Award for Best Actress for their 2021 West End debut in Anna X at the Harold Pinter Theatre. Corrin starred in the 2022 films My Policeman and Lady Chatterley's Lover and starred in the titular role of Orlando at the Garrick Theatre.

Corrin will star in a villainous role in Deadpool 3, set in the Marvel Cinematic Universe.

Personal life
In July 2021, Corrin came out as queer and in July 2022 added "they/them" pronouns to their Instagram account. They later discussed being non-binary in an interview with The New York Times.

In 2022, they became Vogue magazine's first non-binary cover star.

Filmography

Film

Television

Stage

Audio

Awards and nominations

Notes

References

External links

1995 births
Alumni of St John's College, Cambridge
Audiobook narrators
English people of South African descent
Living people
People educated at Woldingham School
People from Royal Tunbridge Wells
Alumni of the University of Bristol
English LGBT actors
People from Seal, Kent
British non-binary actors
Best Drama Actress Golden Globe (television) winners
Queer actors
English television actors
English voice actors
English film actors
21st-century English actors